Daria Lorenci Flatz (born 13 April 1976) is a Bosnian and Croatian television and film actress. She appeared in more than twenty feature films since 2000. She lives and works in Zagreb.

Personal life 
Daria Saltagić was born in Sarajevo to a Bosniak father and Bosnian Croat mother. Her father Emir Saltagić is a television director and her mother Danijela Turkalj is a documentarist. Emir and Danijela divorced a year before the Bosnian War broke out. Upon the outbreak of the war, Daria moved to Zagreb with her grandparents. She stated that the war outbreak made her suffer from anorexia. She is married to Emil Flatz. Together, they have three sons; twins Mak and Fran, and another son, Tin.

Selected filmography

References

External links
 

1976 births
Living people
Actresses from Sarajevo
Croatian film actresses
Croatian television actresses
Golden Arena winners
Croatian people of Bosniak descent 
Bosnia and Herzegovina people of Croatian descent
Bosnia and Herzegovina people of Bosniak descent
Yugoslav Wars refugees